The 2016–17 Orlando Magic season was the 28th season of the franchise in the National Basketball Association (NBA).

Key dates
 May 12, 2016: Scott Skiles stepped down as head coach of the Magic.
 May 20, 2016: The Magic hired Frank Vogel to become their new head coach.
 June 24, 2016: The 2016 NBA Draft takes place at the Barclays Center in Brooklyn, New York; Orlando trades their top selection (Domantas Sabonis), Victor Oladipo, and Ersan İlyasova to the Oklahoma City Thunder in exchange for their defensive-oriented (star) center, Serge Ibaka.
 February 14, 2017: Serge Ibaka gets traded to the Toronto Raptors in exchange for Terrance Ross and the Raptors' 2017 draft pick.
 April 13, 2017: Rob Hennigan is fired as general manager, despite having a year remaining on his contract.

Draft picks

Roster

Standings

Division

Conference

Game log

Pre-season

|- style="background:#fcc;"
| 1
| October 3
| @ Memphis
| 
| Evan Fournier (18)
| Bismack Biyombo (10)
| Nikola Vučević (5)
| FedExForum18,119
| 0–1
|- style="background:#fcc;"
| 2
| October 5
| @ Cleveland
| 
| Jeff Green (19)
| Biyombo, Johnson, Vučević (5)
| Nick Johnson (5)
| Quicken Loans Arena18,789
| 0–2
|- style="background:#fcc;"
| 3
| October 12
| San Antonio
| 
| Evan Fournier (20)
| Bismack Biyombo (11)
| Biyombo,  Hezonja, Watson (3)
| Amway Center15,092
| 0–3
|- style="background:#cfc;"
| 4
| October 14
| Indiana
| 
| Serge Ibaka (19)
| Serge Ibaka (17)
| C. J. Watson (10)
| Amway Center14,097
| 1–3
|- style="background:#fcc;"
| 5
| October 16
| Atlanta
| 
| Serge Ibaka (25)
| Bismack Biyombo (19)
| Elfrid Payton (5)
| Amway Center15,081
| 1–4
|- style="background:#fcc;"
| 6
| October 18
| @ Miami
| 
| Serge Ibaka (15)
| Serge Ibaka (9)
| Elfrid Payton (4)
| American Airlines Arena19,600
| 1–5
|- style="background:#cfc;"
| 7
| October 20
| New Orleans
| 
| Evan Fournier (24)
| Nikola Vučević (12)
| Elfrid Payton (12)
| Amway Center14,901
| 2–5

Regular season

|- style="background:#fbb;"
| 1
| October 26
| Miami
| 
| Evan Fournier (20)
| Nikola Vučević (14)
| Elfrid Payton (5)
| Amway Center19,298
| 0–1
|- style="background:#fbb;"
| 2
| October 28
| @ Detroit
| 
| Aaron Gordon (17)
| Nikola Vučević (14)
| Elfrid Payton (6)
| The Palace of Auburn Hills19,122
| 0–2
|- style="background:#fbb;"
| 3
| October 29
| @ Cleveland
| 
| Evan Fournier (22)
| Jeff Green (10)
| Fournier, Payton (5)
| Quicken Loans Arena20,562
| 0–3

|- style="background:#bfb;"
| 4
| November 1
| @ Philadelphia
| 
| Nikola Vučević (24)
| Nikola Vučević (14)
| Elfrid Payton (10)
| Wells Fargo Center12,529
| 1–3
|- style="background:#bfb;"
| 5
| November 3
| Sacramento
| 
| Evan Fournier (29)
| Aaron Gordon (10)
| Elfrid Payton (11)
| Amway Center17,026
| 2–3
|- style="background:#bfb;"
| 6
| November 5
| Washington
| 
| Jeff Green (18)
| Bismack Biyombo (12)
| D. J. Augustin (5)
| Amway Center18,846
| 3–3
|- style="background:#fbb;"
| 7
| November 7
| @ Chicago
| 
| Aaron Gordon (15)
| Biyombo, Ibaka (7)
| Elfrid Payton (6)
| United Center21,320
| 3–4
|- style="background:#fbb;"
| 8
| November 9
| Minnesota
| 
| Nikola Vučević (24)
| Nikola Vučević (14)
| Elfrid Payton (7)
| Amway Center17,102
| 3–5
|- style="background:#fbb;"
| 9
| November 11
| Utah
| 
| Evan Fournier (21)
| Serge Ibaka (9)
| Evan Fournier (4)
| Amway Center18,846
| 3–6
|- style="background:#bfb;"
| 10
| November 13
| @ Oklahoma City
| 
| Serge Ibaka (31)
| Serge Ibaka (9)
| Elfrid Payton (9)
| Chesapeake Energy Arena18,203
| 4–6
|- style="background:#fbb;"
| 11
| November 14
| @ Indiana
| 
| Evan Fournier (14)
| Serge Ibaka (13)
| Ibaka, Payton, Fournier (2)
| Bankers Life Fieldhouse14,825
| 4–7
|- style="background:#bfb;"
| 12
| November 16
| New Orleans
| 
| Fournier, Ibaka (16)
| Nikola Vučević (14)
| Elfrid Payton (4)
| Amway Center16,127
| 5–7
|- style="background:#bfb;"
| 13
| November 19
| Dallas
| 
| D. J. Augustin (18)
| Nikola Vučević (12)
| D. J. Augustin (6)
| Amway Center18,846
| 6–7
|- style="background:#fbb;"
| 14
| November 21
| @ Milwaukee
| 
| Serge Ibaka (21)
| Nikola Vučević (11)
| Elfrid Payton (7)
| BMO Harris Bradley Center12,306
| 6–8
|- style="background:#fbb;"
| 15
| November 23
| Phoenix
| 
| Evan Fournier (25)
| Nikola Vučević (13)
| Elfrid Payton (7)
| Amway Center17,069
| 6–9
|- style="background:#fbb;"
| 16
| November 25
| Washington
| 
| Serge Ibaka (19)
| Nikola Vučević (17)
| Elfrid Payton (5)
| Amway Center17,103
| 6–10
|- style="background:#fbb;"
| 17
| November 27
| Milwaukee
| 
| Evan Fournier (27)
| Nikola Vučević (16)
| Evan Fournier (7)
| Amway Center16,521
| 6–11
|- style="background:#bfb;"
| 18
| November 29
| @ San Antonio
| 
| Serge Ibaka (18)
| Nikola Vučević (10)
| Evan Fournier (7)
| AT&T Center18,418
| 7–11

|- style="background:#fbb;"
| 19
| December 1
| @ Memphis
| 
| Evan Fournier (28)
| Bismack Biyombo (14)
| Elfrid Payton (5)
| FedExForum13,344
| 7–12
|- style="background:#bfb;"
| 20
| December 2
| @ Philadelphia
| 
| Aaron Gordon (20)
| Bismack Biyombo (13)
| Nikola Vučević (5)
| Wells Fargo Center13,711
| 8–12
|- style="background:#bfb;"
| 21
| December 4
| @ Detroit
| 
| Serge Ibaka (21)
| Nikola Vučević (8)
| Biyombo, Ibaka (4)
| The Palace of Auburn Hills15,206
| 9–12
|- style="background:#bfb;"
| 22
| December 6
| @ Washington
| 
| Elfrid Payton (25)
| Bismack Biyombo (13)
| Elfrid Payton (9)
| Verizon Center12,116
| 10–12
|- style="background:#fbb;"
| 23
| December 7
| Boston
| 
| D. J. Augustin (17)
| Nikola Vučević (10)
| Evan Fournier (5)
| Amway Center17,009
| 10–13
|- style="background:#fbb;"
| 24
| December 9
| @ Charlotte
| 
| Evan Fournier (14)
| Serge Ibaka (7)
| Elfrid Payton (6)
| Time Warner Cable Arena15,707
| 10–14
|- style="background:#fbb;"
| 25
| December 10
| Denver
| 
| Evan Fournier (24)
| Biyombo, Gordon (6)
| D. J. Augustin (7)
| Amway Center17,010
| 10–15
|- style="background:#bfb;"
| 26
| December 13
| @ Atlanta
| 
| Serge Ibaka (29)
| Bismack Biyombo (9)
| Elfrid Payton (14)
| Philips Arena17,789
| 11–15
|- style="background:#fbb;"
| 27
| December 14
| L.A. Clippers
| 
| Aaron Gordon (33)
| Bismack Biyombo (12)
| Elfrid Payton (9)
| Amway Center18,846
| 11–16
|- style="background:#bfb;"
| 28
| December 16
| Brooklyn
| 
| Fournier, Vučević (21)
| Ibaka, Vučević (10)
| Elfrid Payton (5)
| Amway Center17,668
| 12–16
|- style="background:#fbb;"
| 29
| December 18
| Toronto
| 
| Evan Fournier (15)
| Bismack Biyombo (12)
| Fournier, Payton (3)
| Amway Center17,251
| 12–17
|- style="background:#bfb;"
| 30
| December 20
| @ Miami
| 
| Fournier, Vučević (26)
| Nikola Vučević (12)
| Augustin, Payton (6)
| American Airlines Arena19,600
| 13–17
|- style="background:#fbb;"
| 31
| December 22
| @ New York
| 
| Serge Ibaka (23)
| Serge Ibaka (10)
| Nikola Vučević (6)
| Madison Square Garden19,812
| 13–18
|- style="background:#bfb;"
| 32
| December 23
| L.A. Lakers
| 
| Elfrid Payton (25)
| Serge Ibaka (11)
| Elfrid Payton (9)
| Amway Center18,846
| 14–18
|- style="background:#bfb;"
| 33
| December 26
| Memphis
| 
| Aaron Gordon (30)
| Bismack Biyombo (12)
| Augustin, Payton (7)
| Amway Center17,104
| 15–18
|- style="background:#fbb;"
| 34
| December 28
| Charlotte
| 
| Nikola Vučević (21)
| Serge Ibaka (7)
| Payton, Vučević, Watson (4)
| Amway Center18,273
| 15–19

|- style="background:#fbb;"
| 35
| January 1
| @ Indiana
| 
| Nikola Vučević (18)
| Nikola Vučević (11)
| Elfrid Payton (7)
| Bankers Life Fieldhouse17,530
| 15–20
|- style="background:#bfb;"
| 36
| January 2
| @ New York
| 
| Jodie Meeks (23)
| Nikola Vučević (13)
| Elfrid Payton (14)
| Madison Square Garden19,812
| 16–20
|- style="background:#fbb;"
| 37
| January 4
| Atlanta
| 
| Gordon, Payton (15)
| Serge Ibaka (11)
| Payton, Vučević (6)
| Amway Center18,846
| 16–21
|- style="background:#fbb;"
| 38
| January 6
| Houston
| 
| D. J. Augustin (19)
| Ibaka, Vučević (12)
| Aaron Gordon (7)
| Amway Center19,272
| 16–22
|- style="background:#fbb;"
| 39
| January 8
| @ L.A. Lakers
| 
| Fournier, Ibaka, Vučević (19)
| Bismack Biyombo (11)
| D. J. Augustin (8)
| Staples Center18,997
| 16–23
|- style="background:#fbb;"
| 40
| January 11
| @ L.A. Clippers
| 
| Aaron Gordon (28)
| Nikola Vučević (12)
| Nikola Vučević (4)
| Staples Center19,060
| 16–24
|- style="background:#bfb;"
| 41
| January 13
| @ Portland
| 
| Nikola Vučević (30)
| Ibaka, Vučević (10)
| Elfrid Payton (7)
| Moda Center19,344
| 17–24
|- style="background:#fbb;"
| 42
| January 14
| @ Utah
| 
| Elfrid Payton (28)
| Elfrid Payton (9)
| Elfrid Payton (9)
| Vivint Smart Home Arena19,911
| 17–25
|- style="background:#fbb;"
| 43
| January 16
| @ Denver
| 
| Elfrid Payton (20)
| Bismack Biyombo (9)
| Elfrid Payton (12)
| Pepsi Center11,217
| 17–26
|- style="background:#fbb;"
| 44
| January 18
| @ New Orleans
| 
| Gordon, Payton (14)
| Gordon, Vučević (8)
| Nikola Vučević (5)
| Smoothie King Center15,818
| 17–27
|- style="background:#bfb;"
| 45
| January 20
| Milwaukee
| 
| Elfrid Payton (20)
| Bismack Biyombo (13)
| D. J. Augustin (8)
| Amway Center19,307
| 18–27
|- style="background:#fbb;"
| 46
| January 22
| Golden State
| 
| Elfrid Payton (23)
| Bismack Biyombo (14)
| Elfrid Payton (10)
| Amway Center18,846
| 18–28
|- style="background:#fbb;"
| 47
| January 24
| Chicago
| 
| Nikola Vučević (20)
| Ibaka, Vučević (8)
| C.J. Watson (6)
| Amway Center18,846
| 18–29
|- style="background:#fbb;"
| 48
| January 27
| @ Boston
| 
| Rudež, Vučević (14)
| Biyombo, Vučević (7)
| Elfrid Payton (7)
| TD Garden18,624
| 18–30
|- style="background:#bfb;"
| 49
| January 29
| @ Toronto
| 
| Nikola Vučević (25)
| Nikola Vučević (10)
| Elfrid Payton (10)
| Air Canada Centre19,800
| 19–30
|- style="background:#fbb;"
| 50
| January 30
| @ Minnesota
| 
| Elfrid Payton (21)
| Nikola Vučević (15)
| Nikola Vučević (5)
| Target Center11,124
| 19–31

|- style="background:#fbb;"
| 51
| February 1
| Indiana
| 
| Serge Ibaka (20)
| Nikola Vučević (15)
| Nikola Vučević (5)
| Amway Center16,662
| 19–32
|- style="background:#bfb;"
| 52
| February 3
| Toronto
| 
| Fournier, Ibaka (20)
| Serge Ibaka (12)
| Elfrid Payton (6)
| Amway Center17,141
| 20–32
|- style="background:#fbb;"
| 53
| February 4
| @ Atlanta
| 
| Aaron Gordon (16)
| Nikola Vučević (7)
| Fournier, Augustin, Gordon, Watson (3)
| Philips Arena16,691
| 20–33
|- style="background:#fbb;"
| 54
| February 7
| @ Houston
| 
| Serge Ibaka (28)
| Nikola Vučević (19)
| Elfrid Payton (8)
| Toyota Center15,514
| 20–34
|- style="background:#fbb;"
| 55
| February 9
| Philadelphia
| 
| Evan Fournier (24)
| Nikola Vučević (11)
| Evan Fournier (8)
| Amway Center17,829
| 20–35
|- style="background:#fbb;"
| 56
| February 11
| @ Dallas
| 
| Bismack Biyombo (15)
| Nikola Vučević (10)
| C.J. Watson (5)
| American Airlines Center20,052
| 20–36
|- style="background:#bfb;"
| 57
| February 13
| @ Miami
| 
| Evan Fournier (24)
| Nikola Vučević (17)
| Fournier, Payton (4)
| American Airlines Arena19,600
| 21–36
|- style="background:#fbb;"
| 58
| February 15
| San Antonio
| 
| Nikola Vučević (16)
| Nikola Vučević (10)
| Evan Fournier (5)
| Amway Center17,101
| 21–37
|- align="center"
|colspan="9" bgcolor="#bbcaff"|All-Star Break
|- style="background:#fbb;"
| 59
| February 23
| Portland
| 
| Evan Fournier (20)
| Gordon, Vučević (9)
| Jeff Green (4)
| Amway Center17,487
| 21–38
|- style="background:#bfb;"
| 60
| February 25
| Atlanta
| 
| Terrence Ross (24)
| Nikola Vučević (14)
| Elfrid Payton (9)
| Amway Center18,498
| 22–38

|- style="background:#fbb;"
| 61
| March 1
| New York
| 
| Evan Fournier (22)
| Nikola Vučević (10)
| Elfrid Payton (4)
| Amway Center16,005
| 22–39
|- style="background:#bfb;"
| 62
| March 3
| Miami
| 
| Nikola Vučević (25)
| Gordon, Payton (10)
| Elfrid Payton (8)
| Amway Center17,136
| 23–39
|- style="background:#fbb;"
| 63
| March 5
| @ Washington
| 
| Terrence Ross (20)
| Bismack Biyombo (15)
| D. J. Augustin (4)
| Verizon Center19,195
| 23–40
|- style="background:#fbb;"
| 64
| March 6
| New York
| 
| Evan Fournier (25)
| Bismack Biyombo (14)
| Elfrid Payton (10)
| Amway Center16,046
| 23–41
|- style="background:#bfb;"
| 65
| March 8
| Chicago
| 
| Elfrid Payton (22)
| Elfrid Payton (14)
| Elfrid Payton (14)
| Amway Center16,063
| 24–41
|- style="background:#fbb;"
| 66
| March 10
| @ Charlotte
| 
| Aaron Gordon (20)
| Bismack Biyombo (10)
| Elfrid Payton (12)
| Time Warner Cable Arena17,444
| 24–42
|- style="background:#fbb;"
| 67
| March 11
| Cleveland
| 
| Nikola Vučević (20)
| Nikola Vučević (16)
| Elfrid Payton (6)
| Amway Center18,846
| 24–43
|- style="background:#fbb;"
| 68
| March 13
| @ Sacramento
| 
| Nikola Vučević (20)
| Elfrid Payton (10)
| Elfrid Payton (13)
| Golden 1 Center17,608
| 24–44
|- style="background:#fbb;"
| 69
| March 16
| @ Golden State
| 
| Green, Payton (13)
| Bismack Biyombo (10)
| Nikola Vučević (4)
| Oracle Arena19,596
| 24–45
|- style="background:#bfb;"
| 70
| March 17
| @ Phoenix
| 
| Evan Fournier (25)
| Nikola Vučević (17)
| Elfrid Payton (11)
| Talking Stick Resort Arena16,880
| 25–45
|- style="background:#bfb;"
| 71
| March 20
| Philadelphia
| 
| Nikola Vučević (26)
| Payton, Vučević (13)
| Gordon, Payton (4)
| Amway Center16,236
| 26–45
|- style="background:#fbb;"
| 72
| March 22
| Charlotte
| 
| Terrence Ross (19)
| Nikola Vučević (12)
| Nikola Vučević (8)
| Amway Center16,034
| 26–46
|- style="background:#bfb;"
| 73
| March 24
| Detroit
| 
| Terrence Ross (18)
| Elfrid Payton (11)
| Elfrid Payton (10)
| Amway Center18,076
| 27–46
|- style="background:#fbb;"
| 74
| March 27
| @ Toronto
| 
| Elfrid Payton (22)
| Nikola Vučević (15)
| Elfrid Payton (9)
| Air Canada Centre19,800
| 27–47
|- style="background:#fbb;"
| 75
| March 29
| Oklahoma City
| 
| Evan Fournier (24)
| Nikola Vučević (16)
| Elfrid Payton (8)
| Amway Center18,408
| 27–48
|- style="background:#fbb;"
| 76
| March 31
| @ Boston
| 
| Aaron Gordon (32)
| Aaron Gordon (16)
| Elfrid Payton (15)
| TD Garden18,624
| 27–49

|- style="background:#fbb;"
| 77
| April 1
| @ Brooklyn
| 
| Nikola Vučević (27)
| Aaron Gordon (15)
| Elfrid Payton (11)
| Barclays Center15,976
| 27–50
|- style="background:#fbb;"
| 78
| April 4
| @ Cleveland
| 
| Evan Fournier (21)
| Biyombo, Vučević (10)
| Payton, Watson (6)
| Quicken Loans Arena20,562
| 27–51
|- style="background:#bfb;"
| 79
| April 6
| Brooklyn
| 
| Elfrid Payton (22)
| Nikola Vučević (12)
| Elfrid Payton (11)
| Amway Center18,095
| 28–51
|- style="background:#fbb;"
| 80
| April 8
| Indiana
| 
| Terrence Ross (29)
| Nikola Vučević (10)
| Elfrid Payton (10)
| Amway Center18,846
| 28–52
|- style="background:#fbb;"
| 81
| April 10
| @ Chicago
| 
| Fournier, Vucevic (14)
| Nikola Vučević (10)
| Elfrid Payton (4)
| United Center21,545
| 28–53
|- style="background:#bfb;"
| 82
| April 12
| Detroit
| 
| Aaron Gordon (32)
| Aaron Gordon (12)
| Elfrid Payton (13)
| Amway Center19,458
| 29–53

Transactions

Trades

Free agency

Re-signed

Additions

Subtractions

References

Orlando Magic seasons
Orlando Magic
Orlando Magic
Orlando Magic
2010s in Orlando, Florida